RTM may refer to:

Organisations
 Réseau de transport métropolitain, the public transport authority for Greater Montreal
 Régie des Transports de Métropolitains, public transport authority and operator of the Marseille Metro
 RTM Restaurant Group, an Arby's franchise
 Rotterdamse Tramweg Maatschappij, a former tram operator in Rotterdam, Netherlands

Media
 Radio Televisyen Malaysia, a Malaysian state-owned public broadcaster
 Radio Thamesmead, defunct South-East London radio station renamed to Time 106.8
 Radiodiffusion-Télévision du Mali, the primary radio and television network of the Malian state broadcaster
 Right This Minute, an American television program about viral videos

Places
 Rotterdam The Hague Airport, by IATA code
 Reading Terminal Market, a farmer's market in Philadelphia
 Royal Tyrrell Museum in Drumheller

Technology and Internet
 Read the manual
 Release to manufacturing, a stage in the software release life cycle
 Remember the Milk, calendar and reminder web service
 Restricted Transactional Memory, a feature of Intel's Transactional Synchronization Extensions
 Requirements traceability matrix, a document in development to identify the source and allocation of requirements
 Robotics Technology Middleware, a common platform standard for robotics development
 Resin transfer molding, method of fabricating high-tech composite structures
 Real Time monitoring, method of observing and analyzing different types of data as it is being accessed, manipulated, and viewed by another party. the information returned is accurate at the moment that its being accessed or viewed.
 Ready To Merge, a status in a version control system, where a deliverable (or branch in git terminology) is ready to be merged to the main repository (usually the master branch as git tends to domineer)

Other
 Registered trademark
 Resin transfer molding, a composite materials manufacturing technique
 Representational Theory of Mind, in mental representation, a theory of the mind
 Representative town meeting, a form of municipal legislature used in Massachusetts, New Hampshire, Connecticut and Vermont
 Right to manage, a leaseholders right under United Kingdom law
 Robert Tappan Morris, Jr. (born 1965), creator of the Morris worm
 Regression to the mean

See also
 RTB (disambiguation)